Pakiasothy Saravanamuttu Stadium (Tamil: பாக்கியசோதி சரவணமுத்து மைதானம்)  Colombo Oval or P. Sara or simply PSS is a multi-purpose stadium in Colombo, Sri Lanka. It is currently used mostly for cricket matches. The stadium holds 15,000 and hosted its first Test match in 1982. It is named after Paikiasothy Saravanamuttu, a former civil servant and first President of the Board of Control for Cricket. The venue is the home ground of the Tamil Union Cricket and Athletic Club. The P.Sara Oval hosts one Test match per year in Sri Lanka's summer Test calendar, but lost out to Pallekele International Cricket Stadium in 2011 to host Sri Lanka v Australia Tests.

History
The stadium hosted Sri Lanka's first Test, against England in 1982. In 1985, Sri Lanka won their first Test match at this ground, against India.

The ground regularly hosted international matches until 1994, but that was followed by an eight-year lull. In 2002, the ground was used as neutral soil for an Australia vs Pakistan Test Series. The stadium has hosted 15 Test matches, 12 ODIs and one T20I.

It is a relatively small ground, half surrounded by lower-level stands and half by grass banks. The most famous feature is the ivy-covered scoreboard.

Ground figures

International Matches

Key

 P Matches Played
 H Matches Won by Home Side
 T Matches Won by Touring Side
 N Matches Won by Neutral Side
D/N/T Matches Drawn/No Result/Tied

Updated 27 August 2019

Records 
 Stephen Fleming (274 not out) holds the record for highest Test score at this ground.
 Best bowling figures by Shane Warne,7/94 Australia vs Pakistan in 2002.

See also
 List of international cricket centuries at the Paikiasothy Saravanamuttu Stadium
 List of Test cricket grounds
 List of international cricket grounds in Sri Lanka
 List of international cricket five-wicket hauls at the Paikiasothy Saravanamuttu Stadium

References

External links
 Cricinfo profile on P. Sara

Cricket grounds in Sri Lanka
Multi-purpose stadiums in Sri Lanka
Test cricket grounds in Sri Lanka
Cricket grounds in Colombo